Agents of Repression:  The FBI's Secret Wars Against the Black Panther Party and the American Indian Movement is a book by Americans Ward Churchill and Jim Vander Wall, first published in 1988. It describes government campaigns to disrupt the legal political activities of the Black Panther Party and the American Indian Movement, especially through actions of the FBI.

South End Press produced the "Classics Series" second edition in 2002, 538 pages, .

Further reading
 Amnesty International, Proposal for a Commission of Inquiry into the Effect of Domestic Intelligence Activities on Criminal Trials in the United States of America (New York, 1987) pdf
 Anderson et al., Voices from Wounded Knee 1973 (Akwesasne Notes, 1974) 
 Johanna Brand, The Life and Death of Anna Mae Aquash (Toronto: James Lorimer & Company, 1978)
 Dee Brown, Bury My Heart at Wounded Knee (Sterling Publishing, 1970,'12). 
 Robert Burnette and John Koster, The Road to Wounded Knee (Bantam Books, 1974). 
 Noam Chomsky, Towards a New Cold War (Pantheon Books, 1983) 
 Evan S. Connell, Son of the Morning Star (North Point Press, 1984,'97)
 Vine Deloria, Jr., Custer Died for Your Sins (University of Oklahoma Press, 1969,'88)
 Charles Eastman, The Soul of the Indian (Houghton Mifflin Company, 1911) text
 Emma Goldman, Living My Life (Alfred A. Knopf, 1931) text
 Michael Herr, Dispatches (Random House, 1977,'91)
 Bruce E. Johansen and Roberto Maestas, Wasi'chu: The Continuing Indian Wars (Monthly Review Press, 1979) .
 Peter Matthiessen, In the Spirit of Crazy Horse (Viking Penguin, 1983,'92).
 Jim Messerschmidt, The Trial of Leonard Peltier (South End Press, 1983)
 Mari Sandoz, Cheyenne Autumn (University of Nebraska Press, 1953,'05)
 Paul Chaat Smith & Robert Allen Warrior, Like a Hurricane: The Indian Movement from Alcatraz to Wounded Knee (The New Press, 1997)
 U.S. Commission on Civil Rights, Hearing Before the United States Commission on Civil Rights (U.S. Government Printing Office, Washington, D.C.), several hearings, 1975-9
 Joel D. Weisman, "About that 'ambush' at Wounded Knee", Columbia Journalism Review, Sep–Oct 1975
 Rex Weyler, Blood of the Land (New Society Publishers, 1982,'08)
 Howard Zinn, A People's History of the United States (HarperCollins, 1980,'05). .

External links
 Preface to the second edition: Withstanding the Test of Time 
 Excerpts from chapter 9: The Oglala Firefight 
 Excerpts from chapter 12: ...Abuses of the Judicial System 
 More excerpts can be found at: Google Books 
 Publisher webpage: Agents of Repression 

Books by Ward Churchill
Books about the Federal Bureau of Investigation